The 1926 Saint Mary's Gaels football team was an American football team that represented Saint Mary's College of California during the 1926 college football season.  In their sixth season under head coach Slip Madigan, the Gaels compiled a 9–0–1 record, shut out six opponents, won the Far Western Conference championship, and outscored all opponents by a combined total of 242 to 27.  The Gaels' victories including a 26-7 besting of California. The lone setback was a scoreless tie with Gonzaga.

Two Saint Mary's players were selected by the Associated Press as members of the 1926 All-Pacific Coast football team: center Larry Bettencourt as a first-team player and halfback Jimmy Underhill as a second-team player. Bettencourt was later inducted into the College Football Hall of Fame.

Schedule

References

Saint Mary's
Saint Mary's Gaels football seasons
Northern California Athletic Conference football champion seasons
College football undefeated seasons
Saint Mary's Gaels football